"Dub-I-Dub" is a song by Danish Eurodance act and sisters Me & My, released in September 1995 as the first single from their eponymous album (1995). It was successful on the charts in many countries, peaking at number-one in Denmark and Japan, and being a top 10 hit in Belgium, Hungary, Iceland, Israel, Italy, Mexico, Russia, Spain and Sweden.

Remixes
The single was the subject of multiple remixes and was included on band's best of The Ultimate Collection, released in 2007. "Dub-I-Dub" was used in video games, such as Dance Dance Revolution 2ndMix, Dancing Stage EuroMix, Dance Dance Revolution Party Collection, and Dance Dance Revolution X.

"KCP remix" version has appeared on Dancemania'''s Speed series. This happy hardcore version is much faster than any other version of "Dub-I-Dub", at 170 BPM. The first appearance was on the first issue of the series, Speed 1. This was later included on the 2000 greatest hits album of the series, Dancemania Speed Best 2001 Hyper Nonstop Megamix.

Critical reception
Larry Flick from Billboard wrote that "popsters with a penchant for Euro-styled dance music are gonna love this one." He added that "this cute and oh-so-perky female duo romps through this NRGetic jam with infectious glee. First released in Denmark earlier this year, this anthemic track has already earned major props from club spinners and radio programmers throughout much of the world, and it looks like the U.S. will wisely follow suit. Some singles just define the carefree fun of the summer season ... this is one of 'em." Pan-European magazine Music & Media commented, "Doop-E-Doop-E-Doop, We're The Scat-women." And again a scatdance product is coming to you from Denmark. How long will it take before DJs across Europe join in with the chorus?". They also noted that head of music Marc Deschuyter by BRTN Radio Donna/Brussels was the first outside Denmark to report the song. He said, "It's the definition of the summer holiday radio format. My reaction to it was the same as when I first heard Nina's "The Reason Is You", a German singer who went to number 1 in Belgium." A reviewer from Music Week gave "Dub-I-Dub" three out of five, stating that "the bouncing pop-corny sound of Me & My is bound to get punters singing along, a la MCA's Scatman John." Upon the 1996 re-release, the magazine gave the song four out of five, complimenting it as a "catchy pop number". James Hamilton from the RM Dance Update described it as an "irritating Eurovision-ish chirpy girls cooed and chanted galloping Continental hit".

Chart performance
"Dub-I-Dub" was very successful in many European countries, peaking at number-one in Denmark, and within the top 10 in Sweden (2), Belgium (5), Hungary (6), Iceland (6), Italy (5) and Spain (10). Additionally, it was a top 20 hit in Finland (16), Switzerland (14), Norway (12) and Austria (11). In the UK, the single only reached number 148 on the UK Singles Chart. On the Eurochart Hot 100, it peaked at number 28 in October 1995. Outside Europe, it reached number-one in Japan and number two on the RPM'' Dance/Urban chart in Canada. It was also a sizeable hit in Israel, peaking at number eight, while in Australia, it only reached number 135. The song also achieved success in Mexico and Russia, becoming a top 5 hit there. 

"Dub-I-Dub" earned a platinum record in Denmark, after 8000 singles were sold.

Music video
The accompanying music video for "Dub-I-Dub" was directed by Danish artist Peter Ravn. It features Me & My as milkmaids, milking a cow. Other scenes features the sisters as beauty salon workers and nurses. The video was later published on Warner Music Denmark's official YouTube channel in February 2009, and had generated almost 10 million views as of January 2023.

Track listings

Credits
 Music, lyrics and vocals by Pernille Georgi and Susanne Georgi
 Arranged by Dean 'N
 Engineered by Johnny Jam
 Mixed and produced by Dean 'N and Johnny Jam

Charts

Weekly charts

Year-end charts

Certification

References

1995 debut singles
1995 songs
Me & My songs
Number-one singles in Denmark
Number-one singles in Japan
EMI Records singles